Rauchwart is a village in the district of Güssing in the Austrian state of Burgenland.

Geography

Climate

Population

References

Cities and towns in Güssing District